Boyle / O'Boyle is a surname of Irish origin. It is anglised from the Gaelic Ó Baoighill/Ó Baoill.

The clan was founded by a Donegal chieftain, Aneisleis Ó Baoighill, the grandson of Baoghal.

The derivation of the Gaelic/Irish is uncertain, and has been translated as "Peril" or "Danger", "Son of the rash one" or more positively "having profitable pledges" (from the Irish word geall, meaning "pledge").

Their chiefs came to rule over Tír Ainmhireach  in the west of what is now County Donegal, which as a result became known as Críoch Bhaoigheallach; later renamed as the barony of Boylagh under colonial rule.

People
Conor O'Boyle, Irish Defence Forces Chief of Staff
Ciarán O'Boyle, Irish rugby player
Dan O'Boyle (b. unknown, d. 1933), Irish republican; murdered 1933
Fionnuala Jay-O'Boyle CBE DL (born 1960), British lobbyist, charity trustee, and public official
George O'Boyle (b. 1967), Northern Irish professional football player
Harry O'Boyle (1904–1994), American football player
Ian O'Boyle, Irish basketball player
John O'Boyle (born 1928), American professional basketball player
Maeve O'Boyle (b. 1987), Scottish singer and songwriter
Maureen O'Boyle (b. 1963), American television show host and news anchor
Michael O'Boyle, Architecture professor
Neal O'Boyle, president of the Irish Republican Brotherhood from 1907 to 1910
Patrick O'Boyle (1896–1987), American Roman Catholic archbishop and cardinal
Sean O'Boyle (b. 1963), Australian composer
Shaun O'Boyle, Irish science communicator, podcast producer and activist,
Stephen O'Boyle, Irish Sports radio Soccer host in Edmonton Alberta Canada. Covering pro soccer, announcing Fifa World cups & Fifa qualifying games. Host of The Ultimate Soccer Show on TSN 1260. Always Live no delay!
Tommy O'Boyle (1917–2000), American college football coach

References

Surnames
Surnames of Irish origin
Irish families